Million Dollar Babies is a 1994 television film based on the fact based novel Time of Their Lives—The Dionne Tragedy by John Nihmey and Stuart Foxman. It was an American/Canadian co-production by CBS, Cinar (later Wildbrain), and CBC.

Plot
The poor Dionne family lives in rural Ontario, Canada. The mother, Elzire, collapses and goes into what everyone thinks is premature labor. Even though they have no money her husband, Oliva, races to get a doctor. Early on the morning of May 28, 1934 she gives birth to five daughters, the famous Dionne Quintuplets.

The story soon develops into a media frenzy. Radio personality Helena Reid arrives on the scene. Oliva and the other children leave in order to save the quints from infections. After Americans take the lead in providing for the quints, the Ontario government finally starts to provide some assistance. Oliva signs a deal to have the quints displayed at the Chicago World’s Fair, and he is attacked for this by Helena Reid.  The Canadian government moves to take the children. They all develop high fevers, but they recover under the care of Dr. Dafoe. The Ontario government declares the quints wards of the state, naming Dr. Dafoe as their guardian.

The children are placed in a house built just for them across the road. Dr. Dafoe starts to profit from the kids, including taking them on tour.  They kids are put on display and the area acquires a circus-like atmosphere. Finally, the parents are only allowed to visit with Dr. Dafoe’s permission.

The Dionne parents try to tell their story, and in response the government extends the guardianship until the quints are 18 years old.  Dr. Dafoe reaps tremendous money in endorsement deals for the quints. The Dionnes have a baby boy. The quints are kept on a strict schedule and isolated from everyone else and put on display for mobs of tourists. Only one of their nurses disapproves of this and is fired.

The parents finally find a lawyer to help them regain custody of the girls. He strategizes that the quints were only taken because the parents were French-Canadians. They get French nurses and teachers hired. The parents get better access. The government tires of Dr. Dafoe's excesses and removes him as guardian. Oliva learns that the quints are paying for all their expenses out of their funds. Helena Reid returns and now sides with the Dionnes. In a dramatic confrontation, Emilie goes to Dr. Dafoe instead of her mother. Ms. Reid has Dr. Alfred Adler condemn the quints' living situation. The quints and their parents meet the King and Queen. The guardianship is dissolved, and the girls are returned to their parents.

Cast

 Beau Bridges as Dr. Allan Roy Dafoe
 Roy Dupuis as Oliva Dionne
 Céline Bonnier as Elzire Dionne
 Sean McCann as	Premier Mitch Hepburn
 Ginette Reno as Madame Legros
 Domini Blythe as Nurse Lena de Keyzer
 Kate Nelligan as Helena Reid
 Rémy Girard as Attorney Martin Poulin

References

External links

1994 films
1990s American television miniseries
American drama television films
1990s Canadian television miniseries
English-language Canadian films
1990s English-language films
Films directed by Christian Duguay (director)
Dionne quintuplets
DHX Media films
Films set in the 1930s
Films set in the 1940s
Biographical television films
Canadian biographical drama films
Canadian films based on actual events
1990s Canadian films
Canadian drama television films